Paradise Township is a civil township in the south of Grand Traverse County in the U.S. state of Michigan. The population was 4,952 at the 2020 census, an increase from 4,713 at the 2010 census. Paradise Township is home to the village of Kingsley.

History
Paradise Township was organized in April 1870 from a portion of old Traverse Township – Town 25 north, of Ranges 9 and 10 west, and the south half of Township 26 north of Ranges 9 and 10 west.

Communities
 The village of Kingsley is within the township. All of the township south of Mayfield is served by the Kingsley ZIP code 49649.
 Mayfield is an unincorporated community within the township a few miles north of Kingsley.
Summit City was established as a station on the Traverse City Railroad, first called "Summit". A post office at Summit City lasted from 1874 to 1955.
It was founded as a station on the Traverse City Railroad, and was the site of a lumber mill completed in 1883.

Geography
The Boardman River flows through the north of the township.

Paradise Township is the largest township in Grand Traverse County by land area, and second largest in total area, behind Whitewater Township.

Demographics
As of the census of 2000, there were 4,191 people, 1,374 households, and 1,082 families residing in the township. The racial makeup of the township was 97.07% White, 0.21% African American, 0.86% Native American, 0.19% Asian, 0.02% Pacific Islander, 0.45% from other races, and 1.19% from two or more races. Hispanic or Latino of any race were 1.48% of the population.

There were 1,374 households, out of which 45.7% had children under the age of 18 living with them, 62.8% were married couples living together, 11.1% had a female householder with no husband present, and 21.2% were non-families. 15.9% of all households were made up of individuals, and 5.5% had someone living alone who was 65 years of age or older.  The average household size was 3.01 and the average family size was 3.32.

In the township the population was spread out, with 33.0% under the age of 18, 8.4% from 18 to 24, 33.1% from 25 to 44, 18.3% from 45 to 64, and 7.2% who were 65 years of age or older.  The median age was 30 years. For every 100 females, there were 101.3 males.  For every 100 females age 18 and over, there were 98.4 males.

The median income for a household in the township was $44,776, and the median income for a family was $45,652. Males had a median income of $34,804 versus $21,902 for females. The per capita income for the township was $16,507.  About 4.5% of families and 5.2% of the population were below the poverty line, including 6.1% of those under age 18 and 6.1% of those age 65 or over.

References

Townships in Grand Traverse County, Michigan
Traverse City micropolitan area
Townships in Michigan